Allegheny Land Trust is a regional land conservation group headquartered in the Pittsburgh suburb of Sewickley, Pennsylvania, in the United States.

Mission 

"Allegheny Land Trust's mission is to serve as the lead land trust conserving and stewarding lands that support the scenic, recreational and environmental well-being of communities in Allegheny County and its environs."

Current projects 

Allegheny Land Trust is currently pursuing purchase of land formerly owned by the Pittsburgh Cut Flower Company in Richland Township, Gibsonia, Pennsylvania.

In December 2020, Allegheny Land Trust donated 20 undeveloped acres across three parcels in Hampton, Pennsylvania, to expand Allegheny County's North Park.

See also

 Natural environment
 Sycamore Island (Pennsylvania)

References

External links
Allegheny Land Trust website

Land trusts in Pennsylvania
Non-profit organizations based in Pittsburgh
Protected areas of Allegheny County, Pennsylvania